The 1990 Wimbledon Championships was a tennis tournament played on grass courts at the All England Lawn Tennis and Croquet Club in Wimbledon, London in the United Kingdom. It was the 104th edition of the Wimbledon Championships and were held from 25 June to 8 July 1990.

Prize money
The total prize money for 1990 championships was £3,819,730. The winner of the men's title earned £230,000 while the women's singles champion earned £207,000.

* per team

Champions

Seniors

Men's singles

 Stefan Edberg defeated  Boris Becker, 6–2, 6–2, 3–6, 3–6, 6–4
 It was Edberg's 4th career Grand Slam title and his 2nd and last Wimbledon title.

Women's singles

 Martina Navratilova defeated  Zina Garrison, 6–4, 6–1
 It was Navratilova's 54th career Grand Slam title and her 9th Wimbledon title. It was also Navratilova's last Grand Slam Singles title.

Men's doubles

 Rick Leach /  Jim Pugh defeated  Pieter Aldrich /  Danie Visser, 7–6(7–5), 7–6(7–4), 7–6(7–5)
 It was Leach's 3rd career Grand Slam title and his 1st Wimbledon title. It was Pugh's 7th career Grand Slam title and his 2nd and last Wimbledon title.

Women's doubles

 Jana Novotná /  Helena Suková defeated  Kathy Jordan /  Elizabeth Smylie, 6–4, 6–1
 It was Novotná's 8th career Grand Slam title and her 3rd Wimbledon title. It was Suková's 6th career Grand Slam title and her 3rd Wimbledon title.

Mixed doubles

 Rick Leach /  Zina Garrison defeated  John Fitzgerald /  Elizabeth Smylie, 7–5, 6–2
 It was Leach's 4th career Grand Slam title and his 2nd and last Wimbledon title. It was Garrison's 3rd Grand Slam title and her 2nd Wimbledon title.

Juniors

Boys' singles

 Leander Paes defeated  Marcos Ondruska, 7–5, 2–6, 6–4

Girls' singles

 Andrea Strnadová defeated  Kirrily Sharpe, 6–2, 6–4

Boys' doubles

 Sébastien Lareau /  Sébastien Leblanc defeated  Clinton Marsh /  Marcos Ondruska, 7–6(7–5), 4–6, 6–3

Girls' doubles

 Karina Habšudová /  Andrea Strnadová defeated  Nicole Pratt /  Kirrily Sharpe, 6–3, 6–2

Invitation

Gentlemen's invitation singles
 Tom Gullikson defeated  Tim Gullikson, 4–6, 6–2, 7–6

Gentlemen's invitation doubles
 Peter McNamara /  Paul McNamee defeated  Tim Gullikson /  Tom Gullikson, 6–7, 7–6, 13–11

Ladies' invitation doubles
 Wendy Turnbull /  Virginia Wade defeated  Rosemary Casals /  Sharon Walsh-Pete, 6–2, 6–4

Singles seeds

Men's singles
  Ivan Lendl (semifinals, lost to Stefan Edberg)
  Boris Becker (final, lost to Stefan Edberg)
  Stefan Edberg (champion)
  John McEnroe (first round, lost to Derrick Rostagno)
  Andrés Gómez (first round, lost to Jim Grabb)
  Tim Mayotte (first round, lost to Gary Muller)
  Brad Gilbert (quarterfinals, lost to Boris Becker)
  Aaron Krickstein (withdrew before the tournament began)
  Jim Courier (third round, lost to Mark Woodforde)
  Jonas Svensson (third round, lost to David Wheaton)
  Guy Forget (fourth round, lost to Christian Bergström)
  Pete Sampras (first round, lost to Christo van Rensburg)
  Michael Chang (fourth round, lost to Stefan Edberg)
  Petr Korda (first round, lost to Gilad Bloom)
  Henri Leconte (second round, lost to Alex Antonitsch)
  Yannick Noah (first round, lost to Wayne Ferreira)

Women's singles
  Steffi Graf (semifinals, lost to Zina Garrison)
  Martina Navratilova (champion)
  Monica Seles (quarterfinals, lost to Zina Garrison)
  Gabriela Sabatini (semifinals, lost to Martina Navratilova)
  Zina Garrison (final, lost to Martina Navratilova)
  Arantxa Sánchez Vicario (first round, lost to Betsy Nagelsen)
  Katerina Maleeva (quarterfinals, lost to Martina Navratilova)
  Manuela Maleeva-Fragnière (first round, lost to Sara Gomer)
  Mary Joe Fernández (withdrew before the tournament began)
  Helena Suková (fourth round, lost to Zina Garrison)
  Natasha Zvereva (quarterfinals, lost to Gabriela Sabatini)
  Jennifer Capriati (fourth round, lost to Steffi Graf)
  Jana Novotná (quarterfinals, lost to Steffi Graf)
  Judith Wiesner (fourth round, lost to Martina Navratilova)
  Rosalyn Fairbank (second round, lost to Amy Frazier)
  Barbara Paulus (first round, lost to Sarah Loosemore)

References

External links
 Official Wimbledon Championships website

 
Wimbledon Championships
Wimbledon Championships
June 1990 sports events in the United Kingdom
July 1990 sports events in the United Kingdom